The Plucky Duck Show is an American animated television series produced by Warner Bros. Animation and Amblin Television. It is a short-lived spin-off of Tiny Toon Adventures concentrating attention mainly on Plucky Duck himself. It premiered on September 12, 1992 and ended on November 28, with a total of 13 episodes.

History 
Of the 13 episodes produced, only "The Return of Batduck" was original to the series. All remaining episodes were compilations of Tiny Toons produced shorts, though some aired on The Plucky Duck Show first.

The theme song is a rendition of the Tiny Toons theme, set to the same music, but with Plucky himself as the subject of the song. Some of the lyrics were reused in the Tiny Toons episode "It's a Wonderful Tiny Toons Christmas Special".

After the show was canceled, "Batduck" was edited and added in as an episode of Tiny Toons. The show's formula was attempted again several years later when the supporting characters from Animaniacs (Steven Spielberg's next collaboration with Warner Bros. Animation), Pinky and the Brain were also given their own show. Unlike The Plucky Duck Show, however, Pinky and the Brain consisted entirely of original material rather than reusing pre-existing shorts from the show it was spun-off from.

The "Yakety Yak" segment was made commercially available on the rare Tiny Toons Sing! CD/cassette album.

Episodes

References

External links 

 

Tiny Toon Adventures
1990s American animated television series
1992 American television series debuts
1992 American television series endings
American animated television spin-offs
American children's animated comedy television series
Animated television series about ducks
Crossover animated television series
English-language television shows
Fox Kids
Looney Tunes television series
Television series created by Tom Ruegger
Television series by Amblin Entertainment
Television series by Warner Bros. Animation
Television series by Warner Bros. Television Studios
Teen animated television series